Ana Bertha Lepe Jiménez (12 September 1934 – 24 October 2013) was a Mexican actress and beauty queen. In 1953, she was Señorita México (Miss Mexico) and the third runner-up at the Miss Universe contest.

Career

She made her film debut in La justicia del lobo (1952) her first of many films, she then entered and won the Miss Mexico contest. In 1955, she filmed in Cuba Una gallega en La Habana. In 1959, she participated in Señoritas with Christiane Martel, the Miss Universe 1953 in the year Lepe obtained third place. She is internationally known for her starring role as Gamma in La nave de los monstruos (1960), a classic science fiction comedy co-starring Eulalio González "Piporro" and Lorena Velázquez. In 1960, Lepe's father shot and killed her fiancé, actor Agustín de Anda and disappeared from show business for several years. In 1977, she acted in the first of many telenovelas, Pacto de amor.

Personal life
She was briefly married once, but had no children.

Death
Ana Bertha Lepe died on 24 October 2013, aged 79.

Selected filmography

The Viscount of Monte Cristo (1954)
Kid Tabaco (1955)
Look What Happened to Samson (1955)
La Feria de San Marcos (1958)
Where Are Our Children Going? (1958)
La nave de los monstruos (1960)
A Girl from Chicago (1960)
 Rebel Without a House (1960)
Los valientes no mueren (1962)
Tin-Tan El Hombre Mono (1963)
El tesoro del Rey Salomon (1964)
Mundo de juguete (TV) (1974)
El patrullero 777 (1978)
Sentimientos Ajenos (TV) (1996)

References

External links
 
 Biography
 1955 interview
 Russian serials
 Photos

1934 births
2013 deaths
20th-century Mexican actresses
Actresses from Jalisco
Golden Age of Mexican cinema
Mexican beauty pageant winners
Mexican female models
Mexican film actresses
Mexican stage actresses
Mexican telenovela actresses
Miss Universe 1953 contestants